Shree Shree Mahalaxmi Puja is a 1959 Indian Odia mythological film directed by Biswanath Nayak. This is debut film of Sarat Pujari. The tale of Goddess Laxmi leaving the temple to teach brothers Lord Jagannath and Lord Balabhadra, a lesson, was presented in the movie.

Cast
Sarat Pujari
Jharana Das
Anubha Gupta
 Bauribandhu
Shefali
Srikant

Soundtrack 
 "Mora Mana Sina Kehi Jane-na"
 "Aji Kartika Punei Dina Re Majhi Kata Mari"
 "Jaya Tu Maha Lakhmi Jaya Tu Ma"
 "Kete Maja E Dunia Bhai Maja"

References

External links
 

1959 films
1950s Odia-language films